Lusitânia Futebol Clube is a Portuguese football club from Lourosa in Santa Maria da Feira, Aveiro District. The club was founded in 1924 and competes in the Campeonato de Portugal, the fourth tier of the Portuguese football league system.

After winning the Terceira Divisão in 1973, the club reached the semi-finals of the Taça de Portugal in 1993–94. They defeated Argus, Praiense, Académica Coimbra, Beira-Mar, Chaves and Belenenses to reach the semi-final, where they lost 6–0 away to Sporting on 2 April 1994.

Current squad

References

External links
Official site 

Football clubs in Portugal
Association football clubs established in 1924
1924 establishments in Portugal
Sport in Santa Maria da Feira